The ISU Junior Grand Prix (JGP) in Lithuania (sometimes titled Amber Cup) is an international figure skating competition. Sanctioned by the International Skating Union, it is held in the autumn in some years as part of the JGP series. Medals may be awarded in the disciplines of men's singles, ladies' singles, pair skating, and ice dance.

Junior medalists

Men

Ladies

Pairs

Ice dance

References

External links 
 ISU Junior Grand Prix at the International Skating Union

Lithuania